List of buildings on the main campus of the University of Alberta.

References 

 Johns, Walter H. A History of the University of Alberta: 1908-1969. Edmonton: University of Alberta Press, 1981. ISBN 978-0-88864-025-3

University of Alberta buildings
Alberta